The year 1841 in architecture involved some significant events.

Buildings and structures

Buildings

 April 13 – Original Semperoper in Dresden, designed by Gottfried Semper, opened.
 September 2 – Leeds Parish Church reconsecrated after reconstruction.
 Pori Old Town Hall in Finland, designed by Carl Ludvig Engel, completed.

Publications
 English architect Augustus Pugin publishes an article on English parish churches in the Dublin Review (London Catholic periodical); two lectures on The True Principles of Pointed or Christian Architecture and a revised edition of his 1836 book Contrasts.

Awards
 Grand Prix de Rome, architecture: Alexis Paccard.

Births
 February 7 – Auguste Choisy, French architect (died 1909)
 July – Richard Carpenter, English architect (died 1893)
 July 10 – John Belcher, English architect (died 1913)
 July 17 – John Oldrid Scott, English architect (died 1913)

 July 13 – Otto Wagner, Austrian architect (died 1918)
 August 12 – Franz Heinrich Schwechten, German architect (died 1924)
 November 19 – Frigyes Schulek, Hungarian architect (died 1919)

Deaths
 October 9 – Karl Friedrich Schinkel, Prussian architect (born 1781)
 December 30 – John Foulston, English architect working in Plymouth (born 1772)

References

Architecture
Years in architecture
19th-century architecture